Chooka Talesh Football Club (Bashgah-e Futbal-e Chuka-e Tālesh) is an Iranian football club based in Talesh, Iran. They currently compete in League 2.
Majid Akbari

History

Chooka Anzali
In 1991 Chooka Anzali Football Club was founded in Anzali, Gilan Province. They were promoted to the Azadegan League (back then the top league in Iran) in 1993 after winning the 2nd Division. The club was relegated in 1995 and was promoted back in 1998.

Chooka Talesh
The same year the club was promoted back to the top tier they moved to the rural town of Talesh. The team quickly became recognized for their supporters, as despite the small size of Talesh, every game was sold out. Chooka was once again relegated to the 2nd tier in 2000, and they eventually dropped to the 4th tier in 2007.

Honours

Domestic competitions

League
League 2:
 Winners (2): 1992–93, 2019–20

Season-by-Season

The table below chronicles the achievements of Chooka Talesh in various competitions since 1992.

Past Managers
Ghafour Jahani (1992–1997)
Bahman Salehnia (1997–2000)
Alireza Rokhcheka
Nosrat Irandoost (July 22, 2011 – 2014)
Ali Namdari (January 10, 2021–now)

Football clubs in Iran
Association football clubs established in 1992